Southeastern Bible College was a private Christian Bible college in Birmingham, Alabama. The school's 22-acre campus was located in the suburbs jsouth of the downtown Birmingham area.  It was accredited by the Association for Biblical Higher Education.

Southeastern Bible College offered bachelor's and associate degrees through both a traditional day program and an adult evening program for students age 25 and up.  Graduates are serving in various roles of ministry throughout the world as senior pastors, associate pastors, missionaries, teachers and counselors as well as various other positions in both public and private business.

Southeastern Bible College was a non-denominational Christian college and attracted students from a broad range of Christian faiths, including Baptist, Methodist, Presbyterian, Church of God, Assemblies of God, and non-denominational churches. Students applying for admission were required to agree with core principles of the Christian faith, including faith in Jesus as Savior and belief in the Bible as the inspired word of God.

The college closed in June 2017 due to financial challenges. Three months later, the college's board of trustees announced a merger with Piedmont International University.

References

External links 
Official website

Association for Biblical Higher Education
Bible colleges
Private universities and colleges in Alabama
Universities and colleges in Birmingham, Alabama
Educational institutions established in 1935
1935 establishments in Alabama
Evangelicalism in Alabama